The Campbell Post Office–Kuykendall General Store is a historic residential–commercial building in rural Searcy County, Arkansas.  It is located on County Road 73, northwest of Oxley, Arkansas.  It is a single-story wood-frame structure with modest Greek Revival styling.  Its construction date was long thought to be 1920, but it was more likely built around 1900, still an extremely late date for the Greek Revival.  It was converted into a post office and general store in the 1920s by Henry Kuykendall.

The building was listed on the National Register of Historic Places in 1993.

See also 

National Register of Historic Places listings in Searcy County, Arkansas
List of United States post offices

References 

Commercial buildings on the National Register of Historic Places in Arkansas
Greek Revival houses in Arkansas
Government buildings completed in 1900
Buildings and structures in Searcy County, Arkansas
National Register of Historic Places in Searcy County, Arkansas
Post office buildings on the National Register of Historic Places in Arkansas